The 1994 Trans America Athletic Conference men's basketball tournament (now known as the ASUN men's basketball tournament) was held March 3–5 at the UCF Arena in Orlando, Florida. This was the first tournament since 1992 after not being held in 1993.

Hosts  defeated  in the championship game, 70–67, to win their first TAAC/Atlantic Sun men's basketball tournament. The Golden Knights, therefore, received the TAAC's automatic bid to the 1994 NCAA tournament, their first Division I tournament appearance (College of Charleston also participated, receiving an at-large bid).

Since the 1992 tournament, one program had departed the TAAC (Georgia Southern, who left for the SoCon) and three new programs were added (Central Florida in 1993, College of Charleston and Florida Atlantic in 1994), leaving total conference membership at ten teams. However, the two newcomers (College of Charleston and FAU) did not participate in this tournament.

Bracket

References

ASUN men's basketball tournament
Tournament
TAAC men's basketball tournament
TAAC men's basketball tournament